Kukheti was a historical region in eastern Georgia, founded by the Georgian ethnarch - Kukhos, son of Kartlos.  Initially it was a part of Kartli. It borders with Hereti, Kakheti and Kartli. Later, on the basis of Kukheti, Kakheti and Hereti, one region was formed - called "Kakheti", which was no longer considered as part of "Kartli".

The mountain Gareja (2496 m)  and David Gareji monastery complex were located in this province.

See also 
Kakheti

References 

Former provinces of Georgia (country)
Historical regions of Georgia (country)